Danny Williams (7 January 1942 – 6 December 2005) was a South African-born British pop singer who earned the nickname "Britain's Johnny Mathis", for his smooth and stylish way with a ballad.  He is best known for his 1961 UK number one version of "Moon River" and his 1964 U.S. top ten hit, "White on White".

Career
Born in Port Elizabeth, Eastern Cape, South Africa, Williams won a talent contest at the age of 14 and joined a touring show called Golden City Dixies that played throughout South Africa. In 1959, the show came to London where Williams impressed EMI's Norman Newell, who signed the young singer to a recording contract. He was to spend most of his life in the United Kingdom, where at first he made a few moderately successful singles, mainly popular ballads, before scoring a number-one hit with his cover version of "Moon River" in 1961. To this day, it remains his most famous record; he also scored a No. 8 chart hit with "The Wonderful World of the Young" in April 1962. It led to his appearance in the film Play It Cool (1962), directed by Michael Winner and starring Billy Fury as pop singer Billy Universe, and he also appeared in the Tommy Steele film It's All Happening (1963). In 1963, Williams joined a 20-city tour which starred Helen Shapiro and featured the Beatles as a support act on the bill; like many other ballad singers of the day, he was swept away by the new beat group era.

Williams had no more major British hits, even though "White on White" became popular abroad and was his only US top ten hit, charting in 1964 (No. 9 Pop, No. 3 MOR). He continued to record for HMV until 1967 while working the nightclub circuit. In 1968, he had a nervous breakdown and was declared bankrupt two years later. However, he resumed his singing career in the early 1970s, achieving a top 30 success with "Dancin' Easy" in 1977. In the early 1990s, he recorded for Prestige Records and subsequently starred in a Nat "King" Cole tribute show which made several British tours. Compilations of his early recordings, including "Moon River", have been issued on CD.

He died in December 2005 of lung cancer, at the age of 63. Williams was married three times, and is survived by his two daughters (Natali and Melody Williams) and two sons, the actor Anthony Barclay and Michael Stewart.

Discography

Albums
(Record label in parenthesis)

1961: Danny Williams (HMV)
1962: The Exciting Danny Williams (United Artists)
1962: Swinging for You (with Nelson Riddle) (HMV)
1964: With You in Mind (United Artists)
1964: White on White (United Artists)
1966: Romance with Danny Williams (Music for Pleasure)
1966: Only Love (HMV)
1968: Danny Williams (Deram)
1972: Danny Williams (Contour)
1973: I'm a Song – Sing Me (Philips)
1975: To Know You Is to Love You (Philips)
1977: Anytime Anyplace Anywhere (Philips)

Singles

Catalogue
(Record label in bold) 
His Master's Voice
1959: "Tall a Tree" / "I Look at You"
1959: "So High, So Low" / "My Own True Love" 
1960: "Youthful Years" / "It Doesn't Matter"
1960: "A Million to One" / "Call Me a Dreamer"
1961: "We Will Never Be as Young as This Again" / "Passing Breeze"
1961: "The Miracle of You" / "Lonely"
1961: "Moon River" / "A Weaver of Dreams"
1962: "Jeannie" / "It Might as Well Be Spring"
1962: "The Wonderful World of the Young" / "A Kind of Loving"
1962: "Tears" / "Tiara Tahiti"
1963: "My Own True Love" / "Who Can Say?"
1963: "More" / "Rhapsody"
1963: "The Wild Wind" / "Once Upon a Time"
1963: "A Day Without You" / "Secret Love"
1963: "How Do You Keep from Crying?" / "Now the Day Is Over"
1964: "White on White" / "After You"
1964: "Today" / "Lonely in a Crowd"
1964: "The Seventh Dawn" / "The World Around Me"
1964: "Forget Her, Forget Her" / "Lollipops and Roses"
1965: "The Roundabout of Love" / "I Wanna Be Around"
1965: "Go Away" / "Masquerade"
1965: "Lovely Is She" / "Gone and Forgotten"
1965: "And So We Meet Again" / "Violets for Your Furs"
1966: "I've Got to Find That Girl Again" / "Throw a Little Lovin' My Way"
1966: "Don't Just Stand There" / "Now and Then"
1966: "Since You Set Me Free, Baby" / "I Really Don't Know What Hit Me"
1966: "Rain (Falling from the Skies)" / "I'm So Lost"

Deram
1967: "Never My Love" / "Whose Little Girl Are You"
1967: "Love Me" / "When You Were Mine"
1968: "Everybody Needs Somebody" / "They Will Never Understand"

Ocean
1970: "Fare Ye Well - Separate Ways" / "A Girl Like You"

Philips
1973: "I Will Touch You" / "Words of Romance"
1973: "So Begins My Life" / "Where Is the Love"
1974: "Hey Love" / "Life's a Roundabout"
1974: "Every Night I Cry Myself to Sleep" / "Natali"
1975: "Ebony Eyes" / "Believe in the Rain"

Ensign
1977: "Dancin' Easy" / "No More Cane"
1977: "I Hate Hate" / "I Hate Hate (Disco Version)"

Piccadilly
1980: "Daddy Write a Letter Soon" / "Give a Little Bit"

References

External links
Dead Rock Stars website entry
[ Danny Williams biography] at AllMusic
 
 

1942 births
2005 deaths
British pop singers
British crooners
South African emigrants to the United Kingdom
20th-century Black British male singers
People from Port Elizabeth
Place of death missing
Deaths from cancer in the United Kingdom
Deaths from lung cancer
Traditional pop music singers
Deram Records artists
Philips Records artists
Prestige Records artists
United Artists Records artists